The 2012 UNICEF Open was a tennis tournament played on outdoor grass courts. It was the 23rd edition of the UNICEF Open, and was part of the 250 Series of the 2012 ATP World Tour, and of the WTA International tournaments of the 2012 WTA Tour. Both the men's and the women's events took place at the Autotron park in Rosmalen, 's-Hertogenbosch, Netherlands, from 17 June until 23 June 2012. David Ferrer and Nadia Petrova won the singles titles.

Finals

Men's singles

 David Ferrer defeated  Philipp Petzschner, 6–3, 6–4

Women's singles

 Nadia Petrova defeated  Urszula Radwańska, 6–4, 6–3

Men's doubles

 Robert Lindstedt /  Horia Tecău defeated  Juan Sebastián Cabal /  Dmitry Tursunov, 6–3, 7–6(7–1)

Women's doubles

 Sara Errani /  Roberta Vinci defeated  Maria Kirilenko /  Nadia Petrova, 6–4, 3–6, [11–9]

ATP singles main-draw entrants

Seeds

 1Seedings are based on the rankings as of June 11, 2012

Other entrants
The following players received wildcards into the main draw:
  David Goffin
  Mate Pavić
  Igor Sijsling

The following players received entry from the qualifying draw:
  Pierre-Ludovic Duclos
  Márton Fucsovics
  Mikhail Ledovskikh
  Philipp Petzschner

Retirements
  Malek Jaziri (illness)
  Mate Pavić
  Potito Starace (low-back injury)

ATP doubles main-draw entrants

Seeds

 Rankings are as of June 11, 2012

Other entrants
The following pairs received wildcards into the doubles main draw:
  Johan Brunström /  Philipp Marx
The following pair received entry as alternates:
  Martin Emmrich /  Michael Kohlmann

Withdrawals
  Potito Starace (low-back injury)

WTA singles main-draw entrants

Seeds

 1Seedings are based on the rankings as of June 11, 2012

Other entrants
The following players received wildcards into the main draw:
  Kiki Bertens
  Jelena Janković
  Arantxa Rus

The following players received entry from the qualifying draw:
  Akgul Amanmuradova
  Kirsten Flipkens
  Daria Gavrilova
  Urszula Radwańska

Withdrawals
  Michaëlla Krajicek (viral illness)

Retirements
  Kim Clijsters (abdominal injury)

WTA doubles main-draw entrants

Seeds

1 Rankings are as of June 11, 2012

Other entrants
The following pairs received wildcards into the doubles main draw:
  Kiki Bertens /  Arantxa Rus
  Indy de Vroome /  Demi Schuurs

Retirements
  Francesca Schiavone (thigh injury)

References

External links
 

UNICEF Open
UNICEF Open
UNICEF Open
Rosmalen Grass Court Championships